The 2010 United States House of Representatives election in South Dakota took place on Tuesday, November 2, 2010. Voters selected a representative for their single At-Large district, who run on a statewide ballot. On June 8, 2010, the Republicans nominated Kristi Noem, Assistant Majority Leader of the South Dakota House of Representatives and the Democrats nominated the incumbent Stephanie Herseth Sandlin. In the general election, Noem defeated Herseth Sandlin, winning 48.1 percent of the vote to 45.9 percent for Herseth Sandlin.

Candidates

Democratic

Nominee
Stephanie Herseth Sandlin, incumbent

Announced
Stephanie Herseth Sandlin, incumbent

Potential
Steve Hildebrand, deputy national campaign director of Barack Obama's 2008 presidential campaign

Republican

Nominee
Kristi Noem, Assistant Majority Leader of the South Dakota House of Representatives

Announced
Blake Curd, member of the South Dakota House of Representatives
Chris Nelson, Secretary of State of South Dakota
Kristi Noem, member of the South Dakota House of Representatives

No longer running
Thad Wasson, a technician

Declined
Shantel Krebs, member of the South Dakota House of Representatives

Independent
B. Thomas  Marking

Issues
During the general election campaign, Republicans criticized Herseth Sandlin's voting record. They also criticized her lobbyist husband's list of clients, noting that the companies had interests in legislation that would come before Congress. Noem pointed out that the National Association of Broadcasters paid Herseth Sandlin's husband, Max Sandlin, a lobbyist and former Congressman, $320,000 during the years 2008 and 2009 to lobby on their behalf, including a bill co-sponsored by Herseth Sandlin called the Local Radio Freedom Act.  Herseth Sandlin responded that Noem's example was "laughable". The Rapid City Journal editorial board stated that Herseth Sandlin should not be laughing at a legitimate concern.  Roll Call called the Republican effort an attempt "to stoke anti-Beltway emotions". Herseth Sandlin's campaign responded that she did not allow family members to lobby her or her staff. According to a Washington attorney, Herseth Sandlin's policy seemed compliant with House ethics rules that had been tightened in 2007, though Republicans charged Herseth Sandlin was violating the spirit of the conflict interest rules. "The Sunlight Foundation, Public Citizen and other watchdog groups are highly critical of Herseth Sandlin and other Members whose relatives work Congressional corridors", according to Roll Call. The groups have said the House ethics rules should be comparable to the Senate's rules and should ban all lobbying "under the Dome" by relatives of Members.

Polling

On October 24, 2010, Nate Silver of The New York Times FiveThirtyEight.com blog predicted that there was a 69.9% chance that Noem would defeat Sandlin.

Results

Fundraising
The race saw each candidate spend over $1.75 million and was the first in Herseth Sandlin's career where she was outspent.

Funding from political parties and interest groups totaled $2,651,621 for the race, with 78% benefiting Noem. Groups supporting Herseth-Sandlin included the DCCC and CUNA. Noem was supported by the American Action Network, the NRCC and the American Future Fund.

See also
South Dakota's at-large congressional district

References

External links
Elections from the South Dakota Secretary of State
U.S. Congress Candidates for South Dakota at Project Vote Smart
2010 South Dakota General Election: Kristi Noem (R) vs Stephanie Herseth Sandlin (D) graph of multiple polls from Pollster.com

House - South Dakota from the Cook Political Report
South Dakota - At-Large from OurCampaigns.com
Campaign contributions from OpenSecrets
2010 South Dakota - 1st District from CQ Politics
Race profile at The New York Times
Debates
Sparks fly in first U.S. House debate (video), Jonathan Ellis, Argus Leader, August 12, 2010, includes full video (1:29:40) at the Sioux Empire Fair (1st debate)
Kristi Noem says no to school vouchers, Jonathan Ellis, Argus Leader, August 14, 2010, at the Sioux Empire Fair (2nd debate)
Stephanie Herseth Sandlin, Kristi Noem debate health care legislation, Megan Luther, Argus Leader, August 18, 2010, includes full video (1:15:31) at Dakotafest (3rd debate)

House
South Dakota
2010